Margaret Susan Brock  (known as Peggy Brock) (born 1948) is an Emeritus Professor in the School of Arts and Humanities at Edith Cowan University in Perth, Western Australia. Her major areas of interest have been colonial and indigenous history in Australia, the Pacific and parts of Canada and Africa, with particular interest in Australian Aboriginal women. Her work continues to be cited in national and international debates over indigenous policy.

Career 
Born in Adelaide, Brock studied at the University of Adelaide where she was awarded a B.A.(Hons) in 1969 and a PhD in 1992. Brock began her academic career at Edith Cowan University in 1991, gaining successive promotions leading ultimately to a professorial position there in 2007. She was elected a Fellow of the Academy of the Social Sciences in Australia in 2005, and has held Visiting Fellowships at the University of Basel, Switzerland (2003) and the Institute of Commonwealth Studies, London University (2005).

From 1982 to 1989, she was employed as an historian at the Aboriginal Heritage Branch of the Department of Environment and Planning in South Australia. Out of this came her first major publication, Women Rites & Sites. Aboriginal Women's Cultural Knowledge, an edited collection of referenced essays based on original reports to the Aboriginal Heritage Unit by herself and seven other non-Aboriginal women expert in this area (Catherine Berndt, Catherine J Ellis & Linda Barwick, Helen Payne, Jen Gibson, Jane M Jacobs, and Luise Hercus), with an additional concluding chapter on the southern region of South Australia written by Fay Gale, a long-established academic researcher of Aboriginal people, to complete an overview of the whole State. The aim of Women Rites & Sites was to demonstrate and correct the cultural bias and gender blindness of previous research on Aboriginal cultural life. It is an early example of new understandings of Australian indigenous history and culture that began to emerge in the 1980s following Henry Reynolds’ The Other Side of the Frontier: Aboriginal Resistance to the European Invasion of Australia (1981), a controversial history of relations between Aboriginal Australians and European settlers, which has been marked as the beginning of the History Wars.

Soon after, Brock contributed  to the Historical Background to the South Australian Report of the Royal Commission into Aboriginal Deaths in Custody (1990), and native title claims in South Australia have often cited her research.

Her second and third books (Poonindie: The Rise and Destruction of an Aboriginal Agricultural Community and Outback Ghettoes. A History of Aboriginal Institutionalisation and Survival) also focused on South Australia, while the next (Words and Silences. Aboriginal Women, Politics and Land) continued her focus on indigenous women but in the wider Australian context. Her next and three most recent books (Indigenous Peoples and Religious Change, The Many Voyages of Arthur Wellington Clah and Indigenous Evangelist and Questions of Authority in the British Empire 1750-1940) go beyond the Australian context.

In the 2021 Queen's Birthday Honours Brock was appointed a Member of the Order of Australia for "significant service to tertiary education, and to Indigenous history".

Major publications 
 Women Rites & Sites. Aboriginal women's cultural knowledge (1989)
 with Kartinyeri, D., Poonindie: The Rise and Destruction of an Aboriginal Agricultural Community (1989) 
 Outback Ghettos. A History of Aboriginal Institutionalisation and Survival (1993)
 Words and Silences. Aboriginal Women, politics and land (2001, 2003)
 Indigenous Peoples and Religious Change (2005)
 The Many Voyages of Arthur Wellington Clah: A Tsimshian Man on the Pacific Northwest Coast, Vancouver (2011)
 with Etherington, N., Griffiths, G., & Van Gent, J., Indigenous Evangelists and Questions of Authority in the British Empire 1750-1940 (2015)

References 

20th-century Australian historians
Australian women historians
Academic staff of Edith Cowan University
Members of the Order of Australia
Fellows of the Academy of the Social Sciences in Australia
University of Adelaide alumni
21st-century Australian historians
Living people
People from Adelaide
1948 births
20th-century Australian women
21st-century Australian women writers